Krishnabhabini Das (1862–1919) was a Bengali writer and a feminist.

Early life
Krishnabhabini was born circa 1862 in Murshidabad, Bengal Presidency, British Raj. She was educated at home. She married Devendranath Das when she was nine. Her husband moved to England in 1876 to attempt the Indian Civil Service examinations. He was not successful. After that he went to the University of Cambridge to study mathematics. In 1882 he returned to Kolkata to his wife. They left for England together after six months when she was 18.

Career
Krishnabhabini liked British Culture and people and was greatly influenced by it. She was really impressed by the status enjoyed by Women in Britain. In 1885 she published a book about her experience in England, Ingland Banga Mahila (a Bengali woman in England). She was worried about the social views of a woman writing a book so she published in anonymously. In the book she criticised the status of women in Bengali society and praised their status in British Society. She wrote about the freedom enjoyed by British women, their education and employment opportunities. She criticised the treatment of lower classes in Britain and what she viewed was the British society's obsession with money and self-interest. She also introduced the concept of women's rights and feminism to the Bengali readers. She returned to Kolkata in 1889. She continued to write about women's right and the need for female education. She wrote in magazines Bharati, Prabasi, and the Sadhana. She built a women's shelter for widows.

Death
Krishnabhabini died in 1919.

References

1862 births
1919 deaths
Bengali Hindus
19th-century Bengalis
20th-century Bengalis
People from Murshidabad district
Bengali writers
Indian feminist writers
Indian writers
Indian women non-fiction writers
Indian essayists
19th-century essayists
20th-century Indian essayists
Indian women essayists
Indian women travel writers
19th-century Indian writers
20th-century Indian writers
20th-century Indian women writers
19th-century Indian women writers
Women writers from West Bengal
People from West Bengal